Sports in Georgia may refer to:
 Sports in Georgia (country)
 Sports in Georgia (U.S. state)